Baryphyma is a genus of dwarf spiders that was first described by Eugène Louis Simon in 1884.

Species
 it contains six species:
Baryphyma gowerense (Locket, 1965) – North America, Ireland, Britain, Scandinavia, Estonia, Poland, Russia (Europe to Middle Siberia)
Baryphyma insigne (Palmgren, 1976) – Finland, Russia (Europe)
Baryphyma maritimum (Crocker & Parker, 1970) – Western and Central Europe, Kyrgyzstan
Baryphyma pratense (Blackwall, 1861) (type) – Europe
Baryphyma proclive (Simon, 1884) – Italy
Baryphyma trifrons (O. Pickard-Cambridge, 1863) – North America, Europe, Caucasus, Russia (Europe to Far East), Kazakhstan

See also
 List of Linyphiidae species

References

Araneomorphae genera
Holarctic spiders
Linyphiidae
Spiders of Asia